Fredrik Renander (born November 9, 1980) is a Swedish photojournalist, based in New Delhi in India and covering mainly South Asia.

Life & Photography 
He grew up in Sundsvall in Sweden and moved to Stockholm when he was 18. In 2003 he received a scholarship and worked at the Reuters New Delhi bureau after which he began to freelance.

References

External links
 Official website

1980 births
Living people
Swedish photojournalists